Jonathan Erlich and Andy Ram were the last defending champions after victory in 2012, but Erlich chose not to participate and Ram retired from professional tennis in 2014.

Ivan and Matej Sabanov won the title, defeating Ariel Behar and Gonzalo Escobar in the final, 6–3, 7–6(7–5).

Seeds

Draw

Draw

References
Main Draw

2021 ATP Tour
2021 Serbia Open – Men's 2